Maud Junction railway station was a railway station in Maud, Aberdeenshire, Scotland, now housing the Maud Railway Museum. It served as  junction where the line north from Aberdeen split into two routes to the coastal town stations of Peterhead and Fraserburgh, both of which are now closed.

History
The 29 mile long railway from Dyce to Mintlaw opened on 18 July 1861, with the extension to Peterhead opening the following year. The final section north to Fraserburgh opened in 1865. Dyce was on the Great North of Scotland Railway north from Aberdeen Waterloo station. The line was built by the Formartine and Buchan Railway Company, which became part of the GNSR in 1866. In 1923 the GNSR was incorporated into the London and North Eastern Railway, which was in turn nationalised on 1 January 1948. Passenger services on the Buchan lines were withdrawn in 1965 as part of the Beeching cuts. Freight trains continued to operate to Peterhead until 1970 and Fraserburgh until 1979. The track through Maud station was subsequently lifted.

Maud Junction was a major railhead for N. E. Scotland cattle transport. An auction mart in the village was the source of Aberdeenshire beef cattle for transport to all parts of Great Britain. On market days special arrangements were made to accommodate heavy cattle traffic on the single track line to Dyce given the shortage of sidings at Maud.

There was no engine shed at Maud, even though it had a turntable. Each morning a locomotive came down from Fraserburgh to collect the Fraserburgh coaches from the first train from Aberdeen which then proceeded to Peterhead. The last engine at night went back 'light engine' to the Fraserburgh shed.

Current status

Today the station building houses the small Maud Railway Museum and some vacant business units. The museum can be opened by special request to Aberdeenshire Council. Great North of Scotland Railway Association volunteers open the museum on selected weekends most years. The station site is open to be explored and has been mainly preserved but the track is lifted. The remains of the turntable can be seen, along with the cattle loading platforms.

The Formartine and Buchan Way long-distance footpath follows the line of the old track.

References

External links
Maud Railway Station - official museum site at Aberdeenshire Council.
Friends of Maud Museum - The volunteers who open the museum.

Disused railway stations in Aberdeenshire
Railway museums in Scotland
Beeching closures in Scotland
Former Great North of Scotland Railway stations
Railway stations in Great Britain opened in 1861
Railway stations in Great Britain closed in 1965
1861 establishments in Scotland
1965 disestablishments in Scotland
Maud, Aberdeenshire